Askeby is a locality situated in Linköping Municipality, Östergötland County, Sweden with 518 inhabitants in 2010.

References

External links 

Populated places in Östergötland County
Populated places in Linköping Municipality